The Rural Municipality of Bjorkdale No. 426 is a rural municipality (RM) in the Canadian province of Saskatchewan within Census Division No. 14 and  Division No. 4.

History 
The RM of Bjorkdale No. 426 incorporated as a rural municipality on January 1, 1913.

Geography

Communities and localities 
The following urban municipalities are surrounded by the RM.

Villages
 Bjorkdale
 Mistatim

The following unincorporated communities are located within the RM.

Organized hamlets
 Barrier Ford
 Chelan

Localities
 Crooked River
 Marean Lake Resort
 Merle
 Orley
 Peesane
 Pre-Ste-Marie
 Steen

Demographics 

Government 
The RM of Bjorkdale No. 426 is governed by an elected municipal council and an appointed administrator that meets on the first Wednesday of every month. The reeve of the RM is Glen Clarke while its administrator is Cherie Hudon. The RM's office is located in Bjorkdale.

See also 
List of rural municipalities in Saskatchewan

References 

B